Country Music Made Me Do It is the second studio album recorded by Canadian country music artist Meghan Patrick. It was released January 12, 2018 through Warner Music Canada. The album entered the Canadian Albums Chart at number 31.

Critical reception
Marlo Ashley of Exclaim! rated the album 9 out of 10, writing that it "is a culmination and maturation of Patrick's capabilities and talent," and that it "unites an assortment of musical intricacies beautifully." Zack Kephart of The Shotgun Seat wrote that Country Music Made Me Do It is "a smart, wonderfully produced album," and an example of "contemporary country music done right."

Commercial performance
Country Music Made Me Do It debuted and peaked at number 31 on the Canadian Albums Chart dated January 27, 2018. Though it peaked five positions lower than Grace & Grit (2016), the album spent a second week on the chart, at number 84, while its predecessor only spent a single week in the top 100.

Singles
"Country Music Made Me Do It" was released October 27, 2017 as the record's lead single. It entered the Canada Country airplay chart at number 47 in November 2017 and later peaked at number 5 in March 2018, becoming Patrick's first top five entry.

"The Bad Guy" was released April 13, 2018 as the album's second official single. "Walls Come Down" was released as the third single, and became her first Number One hit on the Canada Country charts for the week dated December 22, 2018.

Track listing

Credits and personnel
Credits adapted from Qobuz.

Kelly Archer – background vocals
Kris Donegan – acoustic guitar
David Dorn – keyboards
Adam Hambrick – background vocals
Julian King – engineering, recording
Jason Kyle – engineering
Chris Lord-Alge – mixing
Tony Lucido – bass
Miles McPherson – drums
Andrew Mendelson – mastering
Meghan Patrick – lead vocals
Jeremy Stover – production
Derek Wells – electric guitar

Charts

References

2018 albums
Meghan Patrick albums
Warner Music Group albums
Albums produced by Jeremy Stover